Carrizo may refer to:

Places
Carrizo, Arizona, a place in Gila County, Arizona
Carrizo Creek (Arizona)
Carrizo Creek (New Mexico/Texas)
North Carrizo Creek, a creek formed in Colorado and flowing to Oklahoma
South Carrizo Creek, a creek in Oklahoma
East Carrizo Creek, a creek in Colorado
West Carrizo Creek, a creek in Colorado
Carrizo Gorge Railway, a passenger and freight railway between Tijuana, Baja California, Mexico, and Plaster City, California, United States
Carrizo Hill, Texas, a census-designated place located in Dimmit County, Texas, United States
Carrizo Impact Area, a former United States Navy bombing range in the Anza-Borrego Desert in California, United States
Carrizo Mountains, a mountain range located on the Colorado Plateau in northeastern Arizona
Carrizo Plain, a large enclosed plain in eastern San Luis Obispo County, California, United States
Carrizo de la Ribera, a municipality in León, Spain
Carrizo Springs, Texas, a city located in Dimmit County, Texas, United States

People
Amadeo Carrizo (1926–2020), Argentine football goalkeeper
Antonio Carrizo (1926–2016), Argentine radio and television presenter
Federico Carrizo (born 1991), Argentine footballer
Juan Carlos Carrizo (born 1987), Argentine footballer
Juan Pablo Carrizo (born 1984), Argentine footballer
Pedro Carrizo (born 1980), Chilean footballer
Susan Carrizo (born 1984), winner of Miss World Venezuela 2005
 Carrizo people, an Indigenous people of Tamaulipas, Mexico

Other uses
 Carrizo (plant), Spanish vernacular name of several plants found in a carrizal
 AMD Carrizo, a hardware platform from AMD featuring the Excavator microarchitecture
 Comecrudan languages, a group of possibly related languages spoken in the southernmost part of the U.S. state of Texas and in northern Mexico